Junín is a city in Central Peru, capital of the Junín Province in the Department of Junín. It is located on the southern shore of Lake Junín, at an elevation of 4,107 m (13,474 ft). It was founded as Town of Kings in 1539 and elevated to city level by the Law No. 9834, on October 27, 1943, during the presidency of Manuel Prado Ugarteche.

Raúl Pacheco and Gladys Tejeda, both Olympic marathon runners, were born here.

References

Populated places in the Junín Region